The Pauly D Project is an American reality television series that aired on MTV. The series debuted on March 29, 2012 and concluded on June 14, 2012.

Production history
On April 7, 2011, MTV announced it had picked up two Jersey Shore spin-off shows featuring cast members Pauly D, JWoww and Snooki, picking up twelve episodes of each show. SallyAnn Salsano of 495 Productions was the executive producer of both spin-offs. They later announced the cast additions of nightclub owners Jason "JROC" Craig and Ryan Labbe.

On August 3, 2012, MTV announced that Snooki & JWoww had been renewed for a second season, but The Pauly D Project was canceled.

Cast
 Paul "Pauly D" Delvecchio
 Gerard "Big Jerry" Gialanella
 Jason "JROC" Craig
 Michael "Biggie" Morgan
 Ryan Labbe

Episodes

References

External links
 The Pauly D Project at 495 Productions

2012 American television series debuts
2012 American television series endings
2010s American reality television series
American television spin-offs
English-language television shows
MTV original programming
Reality television spin-offs
Jersey Shore (TV series)